Bernard Morreel (born 3 November 1980) is a Belgian retired footballer.

Club career
Morreel started his senior career in Leuven, playing for Stade Leuven and Zwarte Duivels Oud-Heverlee. After a short passage with Lommel SK in the Belgian Pro League, where he played 16 matches, Morreel was loaned out to OH Leuven in the Belgian Third Division. Morreel then moved to Mechelen (also third tier) before rejoining OH Leuven, a team with which he enjoyed promotion to the Belgian Second Division. OH Leuven rivals Tienen were his next employers, before moving to the fourth tier with teams as Londerzeel, Wijgmaal, and Diest.

References

1980 births
Living people
Belgian footballers
Belgian Pro League players
Challenger Pro League players
K.F.C. Lommel S.K. players
Oud-Heverlee Leuven players
K.V. Mechelen players
K.V.K. Tienen-Hageland players
Association football midfielders
K.F.C. Diest players
KFC Houtvenne players